is a Japanese voice actress affiliated with Office Osawa.

Biography
Uchiyama signed to Arts Vision and made her debut in 2005. However, she retired and got a job, when she was twenty while attending college and due to family circumstances. After three years away, she rejoined Arts Vision in 2010 and made her comeback with the dubbing role of Abbey in the overseas drama Let's Love Vampire delivered on BeeTV. The following year, she won the first regular role as Nagisa Tennōji in A Channel. In April 2017, it was reported that Uchiyama moved from Arts Vision to Office Osawa.

Filmography

Anime
2005
Aria the Animation (voice-acting debut)

2011
A-Channel: Nagisa "Nagi" Tennōji
Blue Exorcist: Kashino
Kimi to Boku: Junko; young Kaname Tsukahara; The Asaba twins mother
Ro-Kyu-Bu!: Kikuchi
Shinryaku!? Ika Musume: Tomomi Mochizuki
Usagi Drop: Kazumi Kawachi

2012
Aesthetica of a Rogue Hero: Valkyria (Ep. 1)
Bakuman. 3: Hitomi Shiratori
Baku Tech! Bakugan: Jinza
Good Luck Girl!: Momiji
Hyōka: Manga club member Sawai (Ep. 16); Noriko Shimizu (Ep. 13)
Kimi to Boku 2: young Kaname Tsukahara; The Asaba twins mother; Aunt 2
Kuromajo-san ga Toru!!: An Sakurada
Saki Achiga-hen episode of Side-A: Arata Sagimori
Say "I love you": Aiko Mutō

2013
Ace of Diamond: Rei Takashima
Aiura: Sumiko Yamashita
Arpeggio of Blue Steel: Kirishima
Doki Doki! PreCure: Daybi
Genshiken Nidaime: Mirei Yajima
Kin-iro Mosaic: Yoko Inokuma
Kotoura-san: Hajime, Hiyori's mother
The Devil Is a Part-Timer!: Mayumi Kisaki
The Severing Crime Edge: Houko Byouinzaka
Walkure Romanze: Emma
Senyu: Ares

2014
Brynhildr in the Darkness: Hatsuna Wakabayashi
Buddy Complex: Margaret O'Keefe
Buddy Complex Kanketsu-hen: Ano Sora ni Kaeru Mirai de: Margaret O'Keefe
Cross Ange: Sayla's Mother
Girl Friend Beta: Otome Kayashima (Ep. 5)
Nanana's Buried Treasure: Shiki Maboro
Nisekoi: Ruri Miyamoto
Riddle Story of Devil: Mako Azuma (Tokaku's aunt)
Sabagebu!: Miou Ootori
Strike the Blood: Yuuma Tokoyogi
The Irregular at Magic High School: Erika Chiba
The Pilot's Love Song: Sonia Palez
Yuki Yuna is a Hero: Fū Inubōzaki

2015
Lance N' Masques: Nori Hizuki
Maria the Virgin Witch: Edwina
Mobile Suit Gundam: Iron-Blooded Orphans: Fumitan Admoss
Nisekoi:: Ruri Miyamoto
Hello!! Kin-iro Mosaic: Yoko Inokuma
Magical Girl Lyrical Nanoha ViVid: Harry Tribeca
Overlord: Mare Bello Fiore
The Asterisk War: Irene Urzaiz
The Heroic Legend of Arslan: Etoile
Ultimate Otaku Teacher: Yukino Kuribayashi

2016
Bakuon!!: Onsa Amano
Nijiiro Days: Mari Tsutsui
Re:Zero − Starting Life in Another World: Puck
Undefeated Bahamut Chronicle: Shalice Balshift
Magical Girl Raising Project: Top Speed (Eps. 1-9)/ Tsubame Murota (Ep. 8)
Digimon Universe: Appli Monsters: Haru Shinkai
Servamp: Ophelia
Tsukiuta. The Animation: Yuki Wakaba
Rin-ne: Kuromitsu

2017
Kabukibu!: Maruko Janome
The Irregular at Magic High School: The Movie – The Girl Who Summons the Stars: Erika Chiba
Battle Girl High School: Anko Tsubuzaki
Land of the Lustrous: Rutile
Yuki Yuna is a Hero: Hero Chapter: Fū Inubōzaki
Schoolgirl Strikers: Animation Channel: Itsumi Natsume	

2018
 Bakutsuri Bar Hunter: Potepen
 Katana Maidens ~ Toji No Miko: Maki Shidō
 The Seven Heavenly Virtues: Michael
 Slow Start: Hajime Nishimura
 Overlord II: Mare Bello Fiore
 Overlord III: Mare Bello Fiore

2019
 Pastel Memories: Irina Leskova
 Bermuda Triangle: Colorful Pastrale: Chante
 Kakegurui XX: Miyo Inbami
 Bakugan: Battle Planet: Shun Kazami
 Isekai Quartet: Puck, Mare Bello Fiore
 Granbelm: Sasha
 Fate/Grand Order - Absolute Demonic Front: Babylonia: Siduri
 Val × Love: Ichika Saotome
 Fire Force: Arrow

2020
 Fire Force 2nd Season: Arrow
 Bakugan: Armored Alliance: Shun Kazami
 Re:Zero − Starting Life in Another World 2nd Season: Puck
 Wandering Witch: The Journey of Elaina: Estelle

2021
 Cells at Work! Code Black: White Blood Cell (Neutrophilic)
 Mushoku Tensei: Jobless Reincarnation: Rudeus Greyrat
 Farewell, My Dear Cramer: Rei Kutani
 Vivy: Fluorite Eye's Song: Elizabeth
 Tokyo Revengers: Emma Sano
 Yuki Yuna is a Hero: The Great Mankai Chapter: Fū Inubōzaki

2022
 I'm Quitting Heroing: Melnes
 In the Heart of Kunoichi Tsubaki: Hana
 The Devil Is a Part-Timer!!: Mayumi Kisaki
 Overlord IV: Mare Bello Fiore
 Bleach: Thousand-Year Blood War: Candice Catnipp

2023
 The Ice Guy and His Cool Female Colleague: Komori-san
 Ippon Again!: Shino Natsume
 Oshi no Ko: Aqua (young)

Original video animation (OVA)
A Channel + smile (2012), Nagisa "Nagi" Tennōji
Arata-naru Sekai (2012), Itsushiya
Nogizaka Haruka no Himitsu: Finale (2012), Setsugetsuka Tennōji
Nisekoi: Loss / Shrine Maiden (2014), Ruri Miyamoto
Nisekoi: Change / Work (2015), Ruri Miyamoto
Nisekoi: Bath House (2015), Ruri Miyamoto
Onna no Sono no Hoshi (2022), Haruko Kagawa

Original net animation (ONA)
Gakumon! Ōkami Shōjo wa Kujikenai (2014), Shushu
Kengan Ashura (2019), Kaede Akiyama

Video games
Fantasista Doll Girls Royale (2013), Ukiwa
schoolgirl strikers (2014), Itsumi Natsume
Dragon Ball Xenoverse (2015), Time Patroller (Female 9)
Battle Girl High School (2015), Tsubuzaki Anko
Persona 5 (2016), Ichiko Ohya
Girls und Panzer: Great Tankery Operation! (2016), Shizuka Tsuruki
Granblue Fantasy (2016), Canna
Azur Lane (2017), USS Oklahoma, USS Nevada, KMS Graf Zeppelin
Yuki Yuna is a Hero: Hanayui no Kirameki (2017), Fū Inubōzaki
Girls' Frontline (2018), OTs-12, AAT-52
Dragalia Lost (2018), Cleo
Arknights (2019), Akafuyu
Bleach: Brave Souls (2020), Candice Catnipp
Sonic the Hedgehog (2021), Tangle the Lemur

Dubbing
Erased as Amy Logan (Liana Liberato)
The Ward as Zoey (Laura-Leigh)

References

Notes

Citations

External links

 

 

1987 births
Living people
Arts Vision voice actors
Japanese video game actresses
Japanese voice actresses
Voice actresses from Tokyo
21st-century Japanese actresses